Tamás Deák (born 27 April 1928, Székesfehérvár) is a Hungarian composer and conductor.

To the greatest extent, he was engaged in jazz music, played the trumpet, and since 1964, he led the Deak big band. He was one of the pioneers of jazz music education in Hungary. Since 1969 he has been the head of the jazz class of the Bela Bartok Music School in Budapest.

On the territory of the USSR and the CIS, he is known as the author of the instrumental composition "Water Ski" (1968), which was later used in the opening credits of the animated series Nu, pogodi! (a number of his other compositions are also used in this animated series), as well as music for the animated series Gustav (1964–1977) and the animated film Cat City (1986).

References

Hungarian composers
Hungarian male composers
Hungarian conductors (music)
Male conductors (music)
1928 births
Living people
21st-century conductors (music)
21st-century Hungarian male musicians